Omkar Das Manikpuri (born 5 August 1970) is an Indian stage and film actor. He is a native of Brindanagarm (Chhattisgarh) and has been a member of folk-theatre doyen Habib Tanvir's, Naya Theatre company for several years. Manikpuri made his Hindi film debut as a lead in Aamir Khan productions' Peepli Live in 2010.

Early life
Manikpuri was born and brought up in a village near Bhilai in the Durg district of Chhattisgarh where he attended school until fifth grade when the death of his father forced him to join a village folk-theatre troupe, mandali. He shifted to Brindanagar (Ward No. 20) in Bhilai in 1981.

Career
Manikpuri started his career at the age of 17, as a performer in the local form of folk theatre called Nacha and joined an itinerant village theatre group. Performing often in makeshift and open air stages, he performed as a singer, dancer, mimic and a stand-up comic. Later he joined Naya Theatre which was founded by Habib Tanvir in Bhopal. With the Naya Theatre he has performed, in India and abroad, classics such as Agra Bazaar, Charandas Chor, Kamdev ka Apna Basant Ritu ka Sapna and Sadak. It was during a performance of the popular play Charandas Chor in Bhopal, that he was noticed by Anusha Rizvi and Mahmood Farooqui, the co-directors of the film, which led to him auditioning for the film in Bhopal.

In 2010, Manikpuri made his film debut in Bollywood with Aamir Khan productions' Peepli Live, in which he played the lead. Initially he had auditioned for the minor role of Machua, but later was given the lead of Natha, which was till then reportedly to be played by Aamir Khan. In 2014, he performed in Ebn-E-Batuta, directed by Varun Middha. Beginning in 2015, he played Jagannath in the television series Santoshi Maa. In 2017, he performed in the Rajasthani language film Taawdo The Sunlight, he also acted in bollywood film Newton. In 2019, he acted in the Malayalam  film Unda alongside Mammootty.

Personal life
Manikpuri's seven-member family lives in Bhilai's Brindanagar area (Ward no. 20).

Filmography

References

 Omkar Das Manikpuri at Sundance Film Festival

External links
 
 Interview – Omkar Das Manikpuri (Natha)

20th-century Indian male actors
Indian male stage actors
Male actors in Hindi cinema
1970 births
Living people
Folk artists
People from Bhilai
Male actors from Chhattisgarh
21st-century Indian male actors